Cladotanytarsus is a genus of European non-biting midges in the subfamily Chironominae of the bloodworm family Chironomidae.

Species
C. amandus Hirvenoja, 1962
C. atridorsum Kieffer, 1924
C. australomancus Glover, 1973
C. bicornuta Kieffer, 1922
C. bilinearis Glover, 1973
C. conversus (Johannsen, 1932)
C. crusculus (Saether, 1971)
C. cyrylae Gilka, 2001
C. difficilis Brundin, 1947
C. dispersopilosus (Goetghebuer, 1935)
C. furcatus (Freeman, 1961) 
C. gedanicus Gilka, 2001
C. iucundus Hirvenoja, 1962
C. lepidocalcar Kieffer, 1938
C. lewisi Freeman, 1950
C. mancus (Walker, 1856)
C. matthei Gilka, 2001
C. molestus Hirvenoja, 1962
C. nigrovittatus (Goetghebuer, 1922)
C. pallidus Kieffer, 1922
C. pseudomancus (Goetghebuer, 1934)
C. tasmanicus Glover, 1973
C. teres Hirvenoja, 1962
C. unilinearis Glover, 1973
C. vanderwulpi (Edwards, 1929)
C. viridiventris (Malloch, 1915)
C. wexionensis Brundin, 1947

References

Chironomidae
Nematocera genera